Donnybrook Stadium, known for sponsorship reasons as Energia Park, is a rugby union stadium in Donnybrook, Dublin 4, Ireland. The stadium has a capacity of 6,000, including a 2,500 seat covered grandstand which was completed in early 2008.

History 
The stadium, also sometimes known as Donnybrook Rugby Ground, is located on the former fair green used for the Donnybrook Fair until the mid-1850s. Used for games by Bective Rangers and Old Wesley since at least the early 20th century, the ground was also the home stadium of Leinster Rugby - until they moved competitive games to the nearby RDS Arena in 2007.

In March 2018 Energia began a sponsorship deal, to rename the stadium as Energia Park for 10 years.

Rugby union 
Primarily used for rugby union, Old Wesley and Bective Rangers are two local clubs who play their home games in Donnybrook. 

Leinster Rugby also still play some friendly games in Donnybrook, with Ireland A, Ireland Women's Team and Leinster underage sides playing home games in the stadium. Between 2015 and 2018, it hosted the Ireland under-20s home matches in the Six Nations Under 20s Championship. Since 2016, it has hosted the Ireland women's team's home matches in the Women's Six Nations Championship.

The stadium is also the principal venue for competitions organised by the Leinster Branch and competitions at all levels from under 13 to junior and senior adult level are played at the ground. This includes games in the Leinster Schools Senior and Junior Cups, and it hosts several games in each competition each year.

Other uses
In August 2012 the stadium played host to two US high school American football teams, Jesuit Dallas and Loyola Academy of Wilmette, Illinois. Jesuit defeated Loyola 30–29 with a last minute game-winning field goal.

The stadium has also hosted music events. For example, it hosted a Michael Bublé concert in July 2008, and gigs headlined by The National and Future Islands in June 2018.

Gallery

References 

Leinster Rugby
Rugby union stadiums in Ireland
Donnybrook, Dublin
Bective Rangers
Old Wesley
Sports venues in Dublin (city)
American football venues in the Republic of Ireland
1964 establishments in Ireland
Sports venues completed in 1964